Alexandre da Silva, nicknamed Guga (born June 14, 1964 in Osasco, Brazil) is a former Brazilian football player who was the Top Scorer for the 1993 Brazilian Serie A with 14 goals.

Guga played for Goiás and Santos in the Campeonato Brasileiro.

Club statistics

Honors
Brazilian League Top Scorer: 1993

References

External links

1964 births
Living people
Brazilian footballers
Brazilian expatriate footballers
Clube Atlético Mineiro players
Goiás Esporte Clube players
CR Flamengo footballers
Sport Club Internacional players
Santos FC players
Botafogo de Futebol e Regatas players
Goiânia Esporte Clube players
Associação Atlética Internacional (Limeira) players
Club Athletico Paranaense players
Bangu Atlético Clube players
Paysandu Sport Club players
Clube do Remo players
Associação Desportiva Cabofriense players
Cerezo Osaka players
Al-Ahli Saudi FC players
Campeonato Brasileiro Série A players
J1 League players
Expatriate footballers in Japan
Expatriate footballers in Saudi Arabia
People from Osasco
Association football forwards
Footballers from São Paulo (state)